The Kandili block is a revenue block in the Tirupattur district of Tamil Nadu, India. It has a total of 39 panchayat villages.

References 
 

Revenue blocks of Vellore district